Global Creatures is a live entertainment company based in Sydney, Australia with offices in New York and London. It is privately owned by Gerry Ryan and Carmen Pavlovic and is best known for Walking with Dinosaurs, which toured for 12 years and was seen by over 10 million people. More recently the company has become known for Moulin Rouge! The Musical which won 10 Tony Awards including Best Musical, and becoming the first Australian-produced musical to originate on Broadway.

Other productions by Global Creatures include DreamWork's How to Train Your Dragon theatrical spectacular, King Kong the Musical, Strictly Ballroom The Musical, and Muriel's Wedding The Musical.

The company has twice topped the BRW list of Australia's Highest Earning Entertainers in 2010 and 2011.

Awards and nominations

Moulin Rouge! The Musical Original Broadway production

Moulin Rouge! The Musical 2018 Boston production

Moulin Rouge! The Musical Original West End production

References

External links
 

Australian theatre managers and producers